Tanel Laanmäe (born 29 September 1989) is an Estonian track and field athlete who competes in the javelin throw. He won the gold medal at the 2015 Summer Universiade. He has also represented his country at the 2009, 2015 and 2017 World Championships.

His personal best in the event, set in 2016, is 85.04 m.

International competitions

Seasonal bests by year

2006 – 69.37
2007 – 76.35
2008 – 75.93
2009 – 81.96
2010 – 77.93
2011 – 78.18
2012 – 80.75
2013 – 81.05
2014 – 81.16
2015 – 83.82
2016 – 85.04
2017 – 82.58

References

1989 births
Living people
Estonian male javelin throwers
World Athletics Championships athletes for Estonia
Tallinn University alumni
Athletes (track and field) at the 2016 Summer Olympics
Olympic athletes of Estonia
Universiade medalists in athletics (track and field)
People from Valga County
Universiade gold medalists for Estonia
Medalists at the 2015 Summer Universiade